Sebastián Ariel Méndez Pardiñas (born 4 July 1977) is an Argentine football manager and former player who played as a central defender.
As a player, he won the Argentine Primera División with all three clubs he represented in his country, and also spent five seasons in Spain.

Playing career
A native of Buenos Aires, Méndez started his career with Club Atlético Vélez Sarsfield. He made his debut in the Primera División on 24 July 1994 against Deportivo Español, aged only 17. During his tenure the club had the most sustained period of success in its history, collecting three leagues and other five international tournaments, with the player being an undisputed starter during his last six years.

In January 2002, Méndez moved to Spain to play for RC Celta de Vigo of La Liga, during the Galician team's heyday. He started rarely in his four-and-a-half-year spell (a maximum of 16 games in the 2004–05 season, with the side in Segunda División), but did amass 69 competitive appearances.

Méndez returned to his country in 2006, signing with San Lorenzo de Almagro and helping it to the following year's Clausura tournament to conquer his fourth league title. He took part in only a few matches during 2008, however, mostly because of constant injuries and ejections. 

Méndez was transferred to Club Atlético Banfield for the 2009–10 campaign, and was a key member of the squad that won the 2009 Apertura, appearing in all 19 games. On 13 December 2009, the club celebrated its first-ever Argentine top flight accolade but, shortly after, he announced his retirement from football at the age of 32.

Coaching career
On 4 April 2010, Méndez returned to San Lorenzo now as a caretaker manager, following Diego Simeone's dismissal. On 21 December he landed his first full-time job, in another of his former clubs, Banfield, where he replaced Julio César Falcioni.

From late 2019 to November 2020, Méndez was Diego Maradona's assistant coach in Gimnasia y Esgrima La Plata and acted as head coach in the matches Maradona could not attend. Following Maradona's death on 25 November 2020, he became Gimnasia caretaker manager but resigned on the next day.

Honours
Vélez
Argentine Primera División: Apertura 1995, Clausura 1996, Clausura 1998
Copa Libertadores: 1994
Intercontinental Cup: 1994
Copa Interamericana: 1995
Copa Sudamericana: 1996
Recopa Sudamericana: 1997

San Lorenzo
Argentine Primera División: Clausura 2007

Banfield
Argentine Primera División: Apertura 2009

References

External links
Argentine League statistics at Fútbol XXI  

1977 births
Living people
Argentine people of Spanish descent
Footballers from Buenos Aires
Argentine footballers
Association football defenders
Argentine Primera División players
Club Atlético Vélez Sarsfield footballers
San Lorenzo de Almagro footballers
Club Atlético Banfield footballers
La Liga players
Segunda División players
RC Celta de Vigo players
Argentina international footballers
Argentine expatriate footballers
Expatriate footballers in Spain
Argentine expatriate sportspeople in Spain
Argentine football managers
Argentine Primera División managers
San Lorenzo de Almagro managers
Club Atlético Banfield managers
Club Atlético Platense managers
Gimnasia y Esgrima de Jujuy managers
Godoy Cruz Antonio Tomba managers
Club Atlético Belgrano managers
Club Deportivo Palestino managers
Cúcuta Deportivo managers
Club de Gimnasia y Esgrima La Plata managers
Argentine expatriate football managers
Expatriate football managers in Chile
Expatriate football managers in Colombia